Barrio Anglo is a village in the Río Negro Department of Uruguay.

Geography
It is located just across the stream Arroyo Fray Bentos from Fray Bentos, the capital of the department, being a western barrio (neighbourhood) of the city.

Population
In 2011 Barrio Anglo had a population of 785.
 
Source: Instituto Nacional de Estadística de Uruguay

References

External links
INE map of Fray Bentos and Barrio Anglo

Fray Bentos
Populated places in the Río Negro Department